The Connecticut Wolves were an American soccer club that was founded by the Clifton Onolfo, the Onolfo Family, and several investors including Tony DiCicco. The Club's inaugural match was attended by 5,200 plus fans and competed in the United Soccer Leagues from 1993 to 2004. Based in New Britain, Connecticut, and playing in Veteran's Stadium, the club started in the D-3 Pro League before moving to the A-League in 1997. The Connecticut Wolves were sold to the City of New Britain in 1997.

History
In 1992 prior to MLS and NASL the USISL had 19 Teams across the South and South East. The Onolfo Family and Investors acquired the rights for USISL Connecticut and announced the Connecticut Wolves in 1993. The USISL grew steadily through the next five years adding teams in the North East including the Long Island Roughriders, NY Fever, Boston Breakers, Rochester Rhinos, Richmond Kickers, Delaware Wizards. 1996 the A League merged with the support of Umbro into the USL now 116 Teams Strong in ProAm, D3 and A League Divisions. The Club ownership was transferred the City oh New Britain, in lieu of moving to Stamford Connecticut. The Wolves enjoyed three seasons over 10 years where they reached the Quarterfinals of USL League playoffs. at its peak the Jr Wolves Academy hosted over 19 team affiliates coached by Wolves Players and Alumni, winning 11 State Championships. In 2002, USL and A League merged USL and D3, the Wolves played there for one year before the City of New Britain folded the team.  Former players for the Wolves include Bo Oshoniyi of Southern Connecticut State University, David Kelly, currently coach at Central Connecticut State University, former Wimbledon F.C. player Carlton Fairweather, and former Moroccan international goalkeeper Chuck Martini (also known as Chuck Moussadik).  Martini subsequently played for at least 12 football clubs in England, mostly non-league, the most recent being Worthing FC of the Ryman Premier League. David Williamson ex Hong Kong International and former Motherwell, Cambridge United league and cup winner with Bohemians of Dublin and cup winner with Hibernians of Malta.

The biggest victories for the Club were the defeat of NE Revolution Alexi Lalas night, defeating Galatasary of Turkey, and on June 26, 2001 when the Wolves  defeated Major League Soccer's Tampa Bay Mutiny 3–2 in the Lamar Hunt U.S. Open Cup to advance to the third round of the tournament.

Year-by-year

Head coaches
  Leszek Wrona (1993–1995)
 Steven Stokoe (1995–1996)
  Brian Bliss (1999)
  Dan Gaspar (2000–2004)

Manager of Football & President
Clifton Onolfo. (1993–1997)

General Manager
Tom Jackson. (1993–2000)

Defunct soccer clubs in Connecticut
USISL teams
A-League (1995–2004) teams
1993 establishments in Connecticut
2002 disestablishments in Connecticut
Association football clubs established in 1993
Association football clubs disestablished in 2002
Sports in New Britain, Connecticut
Soccer clubs in Connecticut
Defunct indoor soccer clubs in the United States